The post-autistic economics movement, or movement of students for the reform of economics teaching, is a political movement that criticises neoclassical economics and advocates for pluralism in economics. The movement gained attention after an open letter signed by almost a thousand economics students at French universities and Grandes Écoles was published in Le Monde in 2000.

Terminology
The French term autisme has an older meaning and signifies "abnormal subjectivity, acceptance of fantasy rather than reality". However, post-autistic economists also "assert that neoclassical economics has the characteristics of an autistic child".

The pejorative reference to the neurodevelopmental disorder autism is considered offensive by some economists. Greg Mankiw has said that "use of the term indicates a lack of empathy and understanding for those who live with actual, severe autism".

Response
The French minister of education appointed a panel headed by Jean-Paul Fitoussi to inquire into economics teaching. In 2000, the panel called for limited reform.

Articles associated with the movement were published in the Post-Autistic Economics Newsletter from September 2000. This electronic newsletter became the Post-Autistic Economics Review and, since 2008, has existed as the peer-reviewed journal Real-World Economics Review.

Several responses to the French students' open letter were also published in Le Monde. A counter-petition signed by 15 French economists was published in October 2000. Robert Solow adhered to the "main thesis" of the French students' petition, but criticised the "opaque and almost incomprehensible" debate that followed among academics. Olivier Blanchard also published a response defending mainstream economics. Other notable economists, such as Steve Keen and James K. Galbraith, wrote elsewhere in support of the French students.

See also

 Real-world economics
 Real-World Economics Review
 Post-Keynesian economics
 Humanistic economics
 History of economics
 Pluralism in economics

References

Further reading
 
 
 
 History of and documents from the PAE Movement
 Real-World Economics Review Blog
 

Schools of economic thought